Illinois's first congressional district is a congressional district in the U.S. state of Illinois. Based in Cook County, the district includes much of the South Side of Chicago, and continues southwest to Joliet.

From 2003 to early 2013 it extended into the city's southwest suburbs until reaching the border of Will County, and covered , making it one of the 40 smallest districts in the U.S. (although there are four smaller districts in Illinois). The district had a population that was 65% African American, the highest percentage of any congressional district in the nation, but that percentage has now declined to 52%. It includes the home of former President Barack Obama.

The 1st is a majority-minority district, and has been since at least the 1920s. In 1929, it became the first district in the 20th century to send an African American to Congress when Republican Oscar Stanton De Priest was elected to represent the district. The 1st has been represented by an African American Member of Congress ever since, the longest ongoing stretch of black representation for any seat in the House of Representatives. Since redistricting by the state legislature after the 2010 census, it is 51.3% black, 40.6% white, and 9.8% Hispanic in population. 

The district is currently represented by Democrat Jonathan Jackson who was elected to succeed longtime incumbent Bobby Rush.

Historical boundaries
The district was adjacent to the 2nd district to the east and south, the 7th district to the north, and the 3rd and 13th districts to the west, and also bordered the 11th district at its southwest corner. The district's northeast border followed Lake Michigan's shoreline for almost a mile.

The district was created following the 1830 U.S. Census and came into existence in 1833, five months before Chicago was organized as a town; the state was previously represented in the U.S. House of Representatives with representative elected on an at-large basis. The district included Southwestern Illinois until 1853. It included the state's northern edge until 1863. Since that time, the district has included all or part of Cook County; since 1883 the population of the district has been primarily residing on Chicago's South Side. Historical populations reflected waves of immigration into the area: previous majority populations were ethnic Irish, German, and east European. Beginning in the mid-19th century, the Irish were the first to establish their physical and political control of the area within the city's South Side.

The current 1st district has a minority-majority population: 51.3% of the residents are African-American.  It has been represented in Congress by African Americans since 1929. Tens of thousands of African Americans moved to Chicago from the rural South in the Great Migration. They were confined by discrimination to the South Side of Chicago and gradually replaced ethnic whites who moved out to suburbs. At one point during the 1980s, more than 90% of the district's residents were black.

While successive redistrictings have given the district a larger percentage of white voters, it is still one of the most reliably Democratic districts in the country; with a Cook Partisan Voting Index of D+28, it is the fourth most Democratic district of the eight that divide Chicago. The district has not sent a Republican to the U.S. House of Representatives since 1935. After the civil rights movement gained support from national Democratic Party for major legislation to restore constitutional rights, including the franchise in the South, most African Americans shifted to support the Democratic Party. Democratic congressional candidates routinely receive over 80% of the vote here. The Democratic trend runs right through to the national level; since the 1950s, Democratic presidential candidates have usually carry the district with well over 70 percent of the vote, and have done no worse than 64 percent/

Geography
Based in Chicago, the district includes the neighborhoods of Auburn Gresham, Burnside, Chatham and Greater Grand Crossing; almost all of West Englewood; the portion of Englewood south of 57th Street; the portion of Woodlawn west of Stony Island Avenue (i.e. excluding Jackson Park); the southern half of Kenwood (home of President Barack Obama); the eastern portion of Ashburn; parts of Avalon Park, Calumet Heights, Chicago Lawn, Douglas, Grand Boulevard, Hyde Park, Morgan Park, New City, Oakland, Roseland, South Shore, Washington Heights and Washington Park; the portion of Beverly southeast of 97th Street and Prospect Avenue; the portion of West Pullman southwest of 119th Street and Racine Avenue; and approximately two square blocks at the northwest corner of South Chicago.

The district's area south of 95th Street is almost entirely west of Interstate 57. The district includes the municipalities of Crestwood, Evergreen Park, Midlothian, Posen and Robbins, nearly all of Alsip, Blue Island and Oak Forest, parts of Calumet Park, Dixmoor, Markham, Orland Hills, Orland Park, Palos Heights, Tinley Park and Worth, and some small sections of Country Club Hills and Riverdale.

Demographics
In the twentieth century after the Great Migration from the South and concentration of blacks on the South Side due to de facto residential segregation, the district became the nation's first with a black-majority population. Since the 1920s, it has included the central area of Chicago's South Side African-American community. Over 85% of the district's residents were black during the period from the 1950s through the 1980s, but redistricting since that time – which redrew the district lines with the goal of maintaining three Chicago districts with black populations exceeding 60% – has reduced the percentage of black residents in the district to 70% in the 1990s. The current figure is 65%. Outward migration has caused the South Side's population to decrease over the years, and the district was expanded geographically to the southwest to gain residents, particularly as the state's congressional delegation has been reduced in numbers due to population changes and reapportionment. The district, which covered only nine square miles in the 1950s, is now more than ten times that size. Nearly half its current area was added for the 2000s.

The district's population dropped by 27% in the 1950s, and by 20% in both the 1970s and 1980s, due to outward migration for suburbanization and because of people leaving the area due to loss of jobs. In redistricting after the 1990 U.S. Census, the district was extended into the suburbs for the first time in 90 years. Chicago is home to 70% of the district's residents (down from 90% in the 1990s), although roughly 60% of the district's area is outside the city border. The district's white population (almost 30% of its residents) is concentrated in the suburban areas and in a few Chicago neighborhoods such as Hyde Park. The district's largest white ethnic groups are Irish (7.1%), German (6.2%), Polish (4.5%) and Italian (3.2%), mirroring the demographics of the neighboring third and thirteenth congressional districts. There are also sizable Dutch, Swedish, Czech, Palestinian, Greek and Lithuanian populations in the area of Oak Forest, Orland Park and Tinley Park, the district's three largest suburbs.

The Kenwood-Hyde Park area for several decades had a significant Jewish community. Existing buildings attest to its history, as the former Kehilath Anshe Ma'ariv temple (its second location) has been the headquarters of Jesse Jackson's Operation PUSH/Rainbow Coalition since 1971 . The area also includes a notable presence of Black Muslims and is the home of Nation of Islam leader Louis Farrakhan in Kenwood.

As of 2000, 38% of the district's adult residents were married.

Redistricting

2011 cycle
In 2011, following the 2010 census, the state legislature redistricted. It expanded the district to cover parts of Cook and Will Counties.  After redistricting, all or parts of Alsip, Blue Island, Calumet Park, Chicago, Country Club Hills, Crestwood, Dixmoor, Elwood, Evergreen Park, Frankfort, Frankfort Square, Harvey, Manhattan, Markham, Merrionette Park, Midlothian, Mokena, New Lenox, Oak Forest, Oak Lawn, Orland Hills, Orland Park, Palos Heights, Posen, Riverdale, Robbins, Tinley Park, and Worth are included. The representative for these districts were elected in the 2012 primary and general elections, and the boundaries became effective on January 3, 2013.

2021 cycle

As of the 2020 redistricting, the district will still be centered primarily around the Chicago's South Side, now with a greater portion of Will County, and a corner of northern Kankakee County.

The 1st district takes in the Chicago neighborhoods of Oakland, Burnham Park, Auburn Gresham, Washington Heights, Greater Grand Crossing, Chatham, and Burnside; most of Ashburn, Roseland, and Calumet Heights; the west portion of Kenwood and Woodlawn; and parts of South Deering, Near South Side, Douglas, Chicago Lawn, South Shore, South Chicago, Hyde Park, Washington Park, Morgan Park, and Mt. Greenwood.

Outside of the Chicago city limits, the district takes in the Cook County communities of Midlothian, Posen, and Robbins; most of Blue Island; the south portion of Lemont; and parts of Oak Forest, Orland Park, Crestwood, and Beverly.

Will County is split between this district, the 2nd district, and the 14th district. The 1st and 2nd districts are partitioned by South Harlem Ave, West Peotone Rd, North Peotone Rd, West Kennedy Rd, Rock Creek, and South Center Rd. The 1st and 14th districts are partitioned by West 135th St, High Rd, Chicago Sanitary & Ship Canal, Thornton St, East 9th St, Madison St, East 12th St, East Division St, South Farrell Rd, Midewin National Tail Grass Prairie, West Schweizer Rd, Channahon Rd, DuPage River, and Canal Road North. The 1st district takes in the municipalities of Homer Glen, Braidwood, Minooka, Wilmington, Manhattan, Frankfort, Channahon, and New Lenox; Lockport east of the Chicago Sanitary & Ship Canal; and part of Joliet.

Kankakee County is split between this district and the 2nd district. They are partitioned by North 5000E Rd, East 6000N Rd, Cardinal Drive, Durham St, East Armour Rd, East Marsile St, Bisallion Ave, and the Kankakee River. The 1st district takes in the municipalities of Manteno; half of Bourbannais; and part of Bradley.

Presidential election results
This table indicates how the district has voted in U.S. presidential elections; election results reflect voting in the district as it was configured at the time of the election, not as it is configured today. The candidate who received the most votes in the district is listed first; the candidate who won the election nationally is in CAPS, and the candidate who won the state of Illinois is indicated with a †.

Economy
The departure of the steel industry, along with other manufacturing jobs from the South Side in recent decades, has created economic difficulties which the area is still trying to overcome. The district's median household income as of 2000, $37,222, trailed the national average by 11.4%. The unemployment rate (7.6%) was more than double the national rate, and nearly 20% of district residents were living in poverty. These problems are more pronounced within the Chicago portion of the district – 14 of the district's 18 suburbs had median household incomes over $40,000 as of 1999, with the six most affluent grouped in the southwest corner of the district. But black middle-class Chicago neighborhoods, such as Avalon Park and Chatham, have remained more stable, along with the more upscale Hyde Park-Kenwood area. Health care and higher education now constitute major economic sectors in the region.

Hospitals in the district include Oak Forest Hospital in Oak Forest and Provident Hospital of Cook County in Grand Boulevard, both part of the Cook County Bureau of Health Services; as well as the University of Chicago Hospitals in Hyde Park, Little Company of Mary Hospital in Evergreen Park, Holy Cross Hospital in Chicago Lawn, St. Francis Hospital in Blue Island, Jackson Park Hospital in South Shore and St. Bernard Hospital in Englewood.

Local educational institutions include the University of Chicago in Hyde Park, Illinois Institute of Technology (IIT) in Douglas, Trinity Christian College in Palos Heights and Kennedy-King College, a Chicago city college, in Englewood, and Chicago State University in Roseland is located directly outside the district at its southern edge; in addition, there are five seminaries in Hyde Park: Catholic Theological Union, Chicago Theological Seminary, Lutheran School of Theology, McCormick Theological Seminary and Meadville Lombard Theological School.

Other area cultural and entertainment attractions include the DuSable Museum of African American History in Chicago's Washington Park, and First Midwest Bank Amphitheatre in Tinley Park; several square miles of Cook County Forest Preserves can be found on three sides of Oak Forest, and Oak Forest's Chicago Gaelic Park  is home to Irish Fest, held annually on Memorial Day weekend. Business and industrial presences in the district include Panduit Corporation , an electrical manufacturer in Tinley Park; Parco Foods , a cookie manufacturer in Blue Island; and Midwest Suburban Publishing, publisher of the SouthtownStar, in Tinley Park.

In addition to Washington Park and those sites associated with the University of Chicago and IIT, district locations on the National Register of Historic Places include:

Politics
Democrats routinely dominate politics in the district, with the main focus of competition being the party primary. Only twice since 1966 has a Republican candidate for Congress received over 20% of the vote, and the Democratic nominee has topped 80% in every presidential race during that time. The district's expansion into the suburbs in the 1990s has incorporated a population that has voted Republican more often; Republican support has passed the 10% mark, and George W. Bush received 17% of the vote here in 2004. His was the best showing by a Republican presidential candidate in the district in over 40 years.

The district has since the early 1970s elected representatives who dissented from the city's Democratic establishment. William L. Dawson, U.S. Representative from 1943 to 1970, maintained the district's loyalty to Mayor Richard J. Daley. His successor Ralph Metcalfe initially continued that stance but publicly broke with Daley over an incident of police brutality in 1972, establishing a rift that persists. When Metcalfe died less than one month before the election in 1978, Democratic party officials named loyalist Bennett M. Stewart to take his place on the ballot, and Republicans replaced their candidate with A.A. "Sammy" Rayner, a former Democratic alderman. Despite the campaign support of Jackson for Rayner, Stewart won the election, although Rayner did get over 40% of the vote.

Stewart served only one term and lost the 1980 Democratic primary to reform candidate Harold Washington. He left Congress in 1983 upon being elected mayor, after winning a contentious three-way primary with 37% of the vote. His successor in Congress was union organizer Charles Hayes. Hayes lost the 1992 primary to Bobby Rush by a 42–39% margin following the House banking scandal, in which it was revealed that Hayes had 716 overdrafts on his congressional checking account. Rush had previously lost the 1988 and 1990 primaries to Hayes.

Rush was a co-founder of the Illinois Black Panthers in 1968, establishing a program for free breakfasts for poor children and a clinic for sickle cell anemia screenings. He became a Chicago alderman from 1983 until his election to Congress, and was an ally of Mayor Washington in the Council Wars of the 1980s. He has maintained a solidly liberal voting record in Congress, consistently voting with the Democratic position over 90% of the time. When he has broken from the party, it has usually been to take even more liberal positions, rather than that held by Republicans. Rush opposed incumbent Richard M. Daley in the 1999 election for Mayor of Chicago, but despite the support of fellow congressmen Jesse Jackson Jr. and Danny Davis, he was backed by only three out of 50 aldermen and lost the election by a margin of 72–28%. He had a 55–45% advantage among black voters. In the 2000 congressional primary Rush emerged with a 61–30% win over challenger Barack Obama. Redistricting following the 2000 U.S. Census moved Obama's home into the second district, although he has since moved back into the first district.

In Congress, Rush has focused on urban revitalization issues, and he was a staunch supporter of gun control efforts before his adult son Huey (named for Black Panther leader Huey Newton) was killed in a 1999 mugging, and has remained a supporter of gun control since. Rush has generally received perfect ratings of 100 from labor groups including the AFL-CIO and AFSCME, and occasionally also from Americans for Democratic Action, the ACLU and the National Abortion Rights Action League. He received corresponding 0 ratings from the American Conservative Union in six of his first 12 years in office.

Prominent representatives

List of members representing the district

Election results

1832 – 1840

1841 – 1850

1852 – 1860

1862 – 1870

1872 – 1880

1882 – 1890

1892 – 1900

1902 – 1910

1912 – 1920

1922 – 1930

1932 – 1940

1942 – 1950

1952 – 1960

1962 – 1970

1972 – 1980

2002

2004

2006

2008

2010

2012

2014

2016

2018

2020

2022

See also
Illinois's congressional districts
List of United States congressional districts

References

External links
Washington Post page on the 1st District of Illinois
  – Congressional District Profiles, U.S. Census Bureau
 
U.S. Census Bureau – 1st District Fact Sheet

01
Congress 01
Constituencies established in 1833
1833 establishments in Illinois